Pinglu may refer to:

Pinglu County, in Shanxi, China
Pinglu District, in Shuozhou, Shanxi, China
Pinglu Canal(平陆运河), under-construction canal in Guangxi